ROCS Cheng Kung (成功, PFG2-1101) is the lead ship of eight  guided-missile frigates, which are based on the  of the United States Navy.

Construction and career 
Laid down on 2 December 1990 and launched on 27 October 1991, Cheng Kung was commissioned in service on 7 May 1993. All of these Taiwanese guided missile frigates have the length of the later long hull Oliver Hazard Perry-class vessels, but have a different weapon and electronics fit.

In order to control the different weapon systems on board that the Mk 92 cannot integrate into, a second CDS, H930 MCS was installed on all eight ships in order to control the eight HF-2 (or four HF-2 and four HF-3 on PFG-1101 and PFG-1105) and the two Bofors 40 mm/L70 guns (except on PFG-1110). The rest of the ships in this class will receive four HF-3 upon their major overhaul.

Gallery

References 

Cheng Kung-class frigates
Ships built in the Republic of China
1991 ships
Frigates of the Republic of China